The 4th Canadian Screen Awards was held on March 13, 2016, to honour achievements in Canadian film, television, and digital media production in 2015.

Nominations were announced on January 19, 2016. Awards in many of the technical categories were presented in a series of galas throughout the week before the main ceremony.

During the ceremony, host Norm Macdonald suggested the award be called the Candy in honour of late Canadian actor John Candy, comparable to the Academy Awards long being known as Oscars. The nickname has still not been officially adopted by the Academy of Canadian Cinema and Television, although academy chair Martin Katz personally endorsed it in a follow-up interview with the Toronto Star.

Pre-show
Leading into the March 13 ceremony, comedian Steve Patterson hosted a special called The Great Canadian Screen Test, quizzing people in the streets of Toronto about the nominated films and who they thought should win the awards in various categories.

Film

Television

Programs

Actors

News and information

Sports

Craft awards

Directing

Music

Writing

Digital media

Multiple nominations and awards

Special awards
Several special awards were given:
Board of Directors' Tribute: Ivan Fecan
Digital Media Trailblazing Award: Ana Serrano
Earle Grey Award: Wendy Crewson
Fan Choice Award: Yannick Bisson
Gordon Sinclair Award: Mark Starowicz
Humanitarian Award: Performing Arts Lodges
Legacy Award: Eugene Levy
Legacy Award: Catherine O'Hara
Lifetime Achievement Award: Martin Short
Margaret Collier Award: Karen Walton
Outstanding Technical Achievement Award: Router-Based Production Audio Design of Much Music Video Awards

References

External links
Canadian Screen Awards

04
2016 in Canadian cinema
2015 film awards
2015 television awards
2016 in Toronto
2015 awards in Canada